Boris Semyonovich Meyerovich (born 1 September 1977) is a former Russian professional football player.

Club career
He played 7 seasons in the Russian Football National League for 5 different clubs.

References

External links
 

1977 births
Living people
Russian Jews
Russian footballers
Jewish footballers
FC Rubin Kazan players
FC KAMAZ Naberezhnye Chelny players
FC Chernomorets Novorossiysk players
FC SKA Rostov-on-Don players
FC Volgar Astrakhan players
FC Gornyak Uchaly players
Association football defenders
People from Magnitogorsk
FC Nosta Novotroitsk players
Sportspeople from Chelyabinsk Oblast